Laoang, officially the Municipality of Laoang, is a 2nd class municipality in the province of Northern Samar, Philippines. According to the 2020 census, it has a population of 61,607 people.

It is the economic, educational, socio-cultural and government center of the 2nd district of the province.

History

Pre-Spanish Time
Written by: Rev.Msgr. Gaspar D. Balerite, H.P.S.Th.D., Vicar General-Diocese of Catarman

In the pre-Hispanic times, the poblacion of Laoang was a settlement called Makarato while the whole island was called Lawang which later on evolved into Laoang.
According to Fr. Ignatius Alzina in his book Historia de las Islas y Indios de Bisayas, the settlement was ruled by a monarch called Dato Karagrag, whose consort Bingi had an irresistible beauty that captivated other neighbouring kings, especially the dato from Albay. (Fr. Alzina lived as missionary in Samar and Leyte for 38 years, from 1634 to 1674, working mostly in Palapag.) Contrary to the popular legend that the word “Laoang” is an evolution of the word “lawag”, Laoang as “Lawang” in 1800s maps may have its origin from early Indonesian settlers of the island. In Sumatra Island (now part of Indonesia), there is a village known Bukitlawang in the vicinity of Lake Toba; Samareños are fond of abbreviations and contractions, hence the current name

Then, describing the place of the settlement, Fr. Alzina in his visit to the place in 1640 says, “On the opposite side of Rawis, on the Lawang Island, which is a sandbar there is a solid ridge of rock. It is fashioned by nature itself and it is so steep that it looks like a façade of a wall… It was a natural fortification, due to its great height of massive rock; it was also secured as if by a moat which encircled its three sides. The fourth side was blocked by a palisade of strong logs. Then too, nature also formed on one side of this rock something like a small cove with its little beach.”

Historian William Henry Scott wrote that a “Samar datu by the name of Iberein was rowed out to a Spanish vessel anchored in his harbor in 1543 by oarsmen collared in gold; while wearing on his own person earrings and chains.” In the local epic called siday entitled Bingi of Lawan as written in the article of Scott, Lawan is a prosperous Lakanate in Samar. Datu Hadi Iberein came from the Lakanate of Lawan

Christianization (Spanish Era)
The Christianisation of Laoang was as early as the evangelisation of the whole island, and began when Jesuit missionaries arrived in Tinago (now Dapdap in Tarangnan, Samar), on October 15, 1596. Soon after, the missionaries traversed the north-west of the island over the Gandara River and reached Ibabao in the north-east. They founded a mission station in Catubig (originally in Binongtoan, Las Navas). In 1605 the Catubig mission established other mission stations: in Rawis, Batac (Batag Island), Laoang, and Palapag. In 1606, the center of the Ibabao mission was moved from Catubig to Palapag. The mission center of Palapag was called Residencia de Cabo del Espritu Santo. In the 1650s Laoang became one of ten mission-stations covered by the Palapag Residencia which comprised stations from Bobon to Borongan.

On February 27, 1767, Charles III of Spain expelled the Society of Jesus from the Spanish Empire and all its territories including the Philippines. The order then left the colony in batches between August 1769 and January 1770, and were replaced by the Franciscans who arrived in Catbalogan on September 25, 1768. Rev. José Anda, SJ was the last Jesuit to minister in Laoang and Rev. Antonio Toledo, OFM took over administration of Laoang, with the titular St. Michael the Archangel upon his arrival in November 1768. In the same year, Pambujan was founded as a visita of Laoang (visita was the 17th-century ecclesiastical term for a village with a non-resident priest, similar to chapelries in Britain).

To prevent raids by Moro invaders, the Governor-General proposed in 1814 the construction of defensive plans. Rev. José Mata, parish priest of both Laoang and Palapag, was cited for being the first to have launched a construction of muralla in Laoang at his own expense. To ease the constant shuttling of the parish priest from Palapag to Laoang, the townspeople of Laoang petitioned for a permanent minister. During the tenure of Rev. Manuel Lozano in the 1840s, an earthquake damaged the parish church, which was renovated between 1848 and 1852 by Rev Sebastian Almonacid. He had the attached rectory fixed as well, and he directed the construction of the tribunal and schoolhouse using stone and wood.

On August 4, 1863, Pambujan seceded from Laoang. In 1869 a great fire broke out in the town and besides many other buildings, it consumed the entire roof and wooden materials of the church, belfry and convent. Five years later the church complex was reconstructed. By 1890, Laoang had the population of 5,384 in the población and a total of 2,754 in four visitas and eight barrios. The last Spanish parish priest of Laoang was Rev. Telesforo Acereda, after which the entire Philippine Islands were ceded by Spain to the United States of America in 1898.

In 1930s, a controversy broke out between the Catholic Church and civil authorities (by then separated by the American colonial government) when an organisation called "Dugo ni Rizal" insisted on erecting a statue of Dr. José Rizal on the plaza, land which the Church claimed. The case was brought to the court with Msgr. Sofronio Hacbang, Bishop of Samar and Leyte, acting as applicant-appellant. The Supreme Court en banc issued a decision on July 31, 1935, which confirmed that the lots presently occupied by the church, convent, auditorium, and plaza were ecclesiastical property. The presence of José Rizal's statue caused the plaza to be erroneously called “Plaza Rizal” for years, even though it had been called Plaza María since Spanish times. It is now called “Plaza Inmaculada Concepción” in honour of the Immaculate Conception, whose statue stands on the square's western side. In the 1970s, recognising the Church's ownership of the plaza, the civil government moved the statue of Rizal from the centre of the square to its present location on the eastern side.

When the Diocese of Catarman was formally created on March 11, 1975, Laoang became the center of the Vicariate of St. Thérèse of Child Jesus which comprised the other towns of Palapag, Catubig, Las Navas, Pambujan, and San Roque. When the diocese celebrated its 25th Anniversary two mission centers were created: Salvacion which covered all the barrios of Batag Island including Barangay Cahayagan; and Rawis which comprised all the surrounding barangays bordering on barrios on the right banks of the river going to Catubig.

The religiosity of Laoang is graced when one of its parish priests was proclaimed “Blessed” by Pope Benedict XVI on October 12, 2007. He was Fr. Angel Ranera, OFM, the parish priest of Laoang from 1924 till his return to Spain in 1929. [During the Spanish Civil War, he faced the firing squad of the rebels with two other priests on August 16, 1936.] The first council of the Knights of Columbus in Northern Samar was installed in Laoang in 1949, the Msgr. Diasnes Council. Since 1957 only in Laoang that a communitarian devotion to Mary, Barangay sang Birhen, is still being practiced without interruption. Immediately after the creation of the Diocese of Catarman one of the initial acts of the first diocesan bishop, Angel T. Hobayon, was to petition the Pope to grant a papal honor to the parish priest of Laoang with the title “Domestic Prelate,” to Potenciano Ortega. When the North of Samar celebrated its 400th year of Christianity, the Bishop again petitioned the Pope to grand Papal Honors with the title “Honorary Prelates” to three priests, two of them from Laoang: Msgr. Gaspar Balerite and Msgr. Romeo Infante. Of all the parishes in the whole island of Samar, Laoang has the most number of native priests: as of this writing, 37 priests in all.

Geography
The municipality lies on the eastern side of the province. Bordering Pambujan in the west, Palapag facing east and the municipality of Catubig as its southern neighbor while the Philippine Sea stretches in the north.

Laoang is geographically divided into three distinct areas. The first is the lowlands of the mainland of Samar Island along the mouth of the Catubig River. The second is Laoang Island itself where the poblacion is situated, and the third is the Batag Island which forms as a natural barrier from the waters of the Pacific Ocean.

Climate

Barangays
Laoang is politically subdivided into 56 barangays.

Demographics

Religion
Majority of the populace are Roman Catholic and is very religious. It has the most number (37) of ordained presbyters (including five monsignors) of the Roman Catholic Church in the whole region with the exception of the municipality of Villareal, Samar.

Economy 

Laoang serves as the economic center of the Northeastern Pacific region.

Education
The municipality boasts for having three elementary school districts (two in the poblacion area), 13 secondary schools including one private-sectarian high school (Colegio de Santa Teresita) and a laboratory high school. The University of Eastern Philippines maintains one satellite branch.

Culture
Several festivities are celebrated throughout the year. In the 4th Sunday of January, they celebrate the feast of Santo Niño or the Child Jesus.

Flores De Mayo, like any other Philippine town, is also done in May and the town's fiesta is on September 28–29 in honor of its patron St. Michael the Archangel.

Its people shares its rich oral/written literature such as surumatanons and is handed down from the earliest inhabitants to the new generation.

Also popular are the kundimans in Waray version, sidays and individual compositions. One of this is the "Laoang Sunset" or "Sidsid San Adlaw Sa Laoang" composed by Bernardino Muncada which portrays the beauty of the town.

Tourism
Batag Island Lighthouse
Onay Beach
Kalakhaan Islet
St. Michael the Archangel Parish
Pasyao Cliff
Almuraya Fortress
Grand Canyon

Notable personalities

 Oskar Muncada Monje  - Waray-language poet, playwright, and songwriter
Angel Aquino - Filipino fashion model, TV host, and FAMAS and Gawad Urian Award-nominated film and TV actress
Errol "Budoy" Marabiles - Filipino reggae musician, songwriter and TV host; vocalist of the reggae band Junior Kilat
Pooh - Filipino actor, comedian, impersonator, singer, and TV host.
Aloy Adlawan - Multi-awarded Filipino filmmaker, writer, producer, director, and composer

Notes

External links

 [ Philippine Standard Geographic Code]
Philippine Census Information
Local Governance Performance Management System

Municipalities of Northern Samar